Colin Healy (born 14 March 1980) is a former midfield footballer from Ireland. He has been manager of Cork City F.C. since late 2020.

He started his senior career at Celtic, spending five years with the Scottish club before joining English side Sunderland in 2003, where he spent three years. He returned to Scotland in 2006 to sign for Livingston. After a short spell with Livingston he returned to England to join Barnsley. After leaving Barnsley in 2007, he joined Irish side Cork City, where he spent two years before joining English side Ipswich Town. He spent two years with Ipswich before returning to the Republic of Ireland to sign for former club Cork City. Healy represented the Republic of Ireland at youth and senior level. He made his senior debut for his country in 2002, going on to win 13 caps, scoring once.

Club career

Early career
Healy was born in Ballincollig, County Cork. He came from a sporting family, with his grandfather Paddy Healy having been a Gaelic footballer and hurler who won All-Ireland Senior Football Championship and All-Ireland Senior Hurling Championship medals with the Cork inter-county football and hurling teams respectively in 1945 and 1946. Healy played local soccer with Ballincollig and then Wilton United. He attended the FAS/FAI course in Cork run by former Celtic and Cork City midfielder Mike Conroy and from here he was taken to Celtic Park. He would go on to score three goals for Celtic, his first coming in a league game against Dundee in February 2000. His other two goals came in Scottish League Cup ties against Hearts and Stirling Albion. With Celtic he won a Scottish League Cup medal, playing in the team that beat Kilmarnock 3–0 at Hampden on 18 March 2001.

Sunderland
Sunderland signed Healy from Celtic in 2003. In December 2003 he broke his leg in a match against a former loan club, Coventry City after a challenge by Moroccan international Youssef Safri.

In October 2004, he broke his leg again soon after resuming training with Sunderland, after a tackle from then manager Mick McCarthy. In January 2006, it was announced that Healy's contract with Sunderland had expired, and the midfielder left the club.

Livingston and Barnsley
Healy joined SPL club Livingston on 10 March 2006 until the end of the season. On 10 August 2006 Healy signed a one-year contract with Barnsley. Having made only 10 appearances for Barnsley, he had his contract cancelled by mutual consent.

Cork City and FIFA case
On 20 February 2007 he signed a two-year contract with hometown League of Ireland club Cork City, alongside former international colleague Gareth Farrelly. FIFA ruled both players to be unable to play for the club, citing a rule forbidding players from transferring between clubs more than twice in a 12-month period between July and June. FIFA rejected appeals made by both players. On 1 July 2007 both Healy and Gareth Farrelly became eligible to play for Cork City. On this date, they both played for the club's under-21 team against Lifford of Ennis, Co Clare, winning the game 2–0.

Healy made his full Cork City debut against Bohemians when they were beaten in extra time in the Eircom League Cup Quarter Final held at Dalymount Park on 3 July 2007.

Healy signed a two-year contract for Cork in 2009. In April 2009, Healy scored his first goal for Cork at Tallaght Stadium.

Ipswich Town
On 16 July 2009, it was confirmed that Cork City had accepted a £100,000 bid from Hartlepool United to take Healy and fellow Cork City teammate Denis Behan to Victoria Park, Hartlepool. However, five days later, Hartlepool United manager Chris Turner confirmed that the deal had not happened due to late interest from Ipswich Town. Healy subsequently signed for Ipswich for an undisclosed fee. In January 2010, he signed on-loan with Scottish Premier League club Falkirk. At Falkirk he scored once against Aberdeen.

Returning to Ipswich from the on-loan spell in Scotland, during the League Cup Semi-Final 2011 first leg win by Ipswich Town over Arsenal, it was commented that  "Colin Healy made Cesc Fabregas look like Colin Healy". In February 2011 Healy scored his first goal for Ipswich against Doncaster Rovers. His contract was terminated by mutual consent in November 2011.

Return to Cork City
In 2013, Healy returned to Cork City on a three-year deal. His most memorable moment came against St Patrick's Athletic in 2014 when he scored a late over head kick against a fellow title rival. He and Cork finished runners up behind Dundalk for three years in a row and Healy lost the 2015 FAI Cup to Dundalk before finally winning a trophy in March 2016 in the Presidents Cup and the 2016 FAI Cup final where he came off the bench. He retired from playing in April 2017.

After retirement from playing he was Cork City's "head of academy" for a number of seasons before being appointed "first team head coach" in December 2020.

International career
Healy played and scored a goal against Australia at the FIFA World Youth Championship finals in Nigeria in 1999.

He represented his country at the UEFA U-19 Championship in Sweden in 1999, and won a bronze medal.

During the Saipan incident between Mick McCarthy and fellow Cork man Roy Keane at the 2002 FIFA World Cup, Healy was called upon by McCarthy as the replacement should Keane be dropped from the squad. A succession of changes-of-heart by the Manchester United player led to the call-up being delayed and the deadline passing, with Healy unable to join the World Cup squad.

Career statistics

Club
Source:

International
Source:

International goals
Source:
Republic of Ireland score listed first, score column indicates score after each Healy goal.

Honours
Celtic
Scottish Premier League: 2000–01
Scottish League Cup: 2000–01 
Cork City
FAI Cup: 2007, 2016
Setanta Sports Cup: 2008
FAI President's Cup: 2016
Individual 
PFAI Team of the Year: 2014 Premier Division
League of Ireland Player of the Year: 2014

References

External links

 

1980 births
Living people
Association footballers from Cork (city)
Republic of Ireland association footballers
Republic of Ireland youth international footballers
Republic of Ireland international footballers
Association football midfielders
Celtic F.C. players
Coventry City F.C. players
Sunderland A.F.C. players
Livingston F.C. players
Barnsley F.C. players
Bradford City A.F.C. players
Cork City F.C. players
Ipswich Town F.C. players
Falkirk F.C. players
Scottish Premier League players
English Football League players
League of Ireland players